Rear Admiral Wolfgang Enrique Larrazábal Ugueto  (5 March 1911 – 27 February 2003) was a Venezuelan naval officer and politician.  He served as the president of Venezuela following the overthrow of Marcos Pérez Jiménez on 23 January 1958. He resigned later that year to run in the 1958 presidential election, but lost to former president Rómulo Betancourt.

See also 

Presidents of Venezuela
List of Venezuelans

References 
  Wolfgang Larrazábal – Official biography.
  Wolfgang Larrazábal

1911 births
2003 deaths
People from Carúpano
Venezuelan people of Basque descent
Democratic Republican Union politicians
Presidents of Venezuela
Venezuelan admirals
Leaders who took power by coup